KRFO (1390 AM) is a classic hits music formatted radio station in Owatonna, Minnesota. The station is owned by Townsquare Media.

On August 30, 2013, a deal was announced in which Townsquare Media would acquire 53 Cumulus Media stations, including KRFO, for $238 million. The deal is part of Cumulus' acquisition of Dial Global; Townsquare and Dial Global are both controlled by Oaktree Capital Management. The sale to Townsquare was completed on November 14, 2013. On April 4, 2021, KRFO's FM translator K234DB (94.7 FM) signed on the air and began simulcasting KRFO-AM with a total of 250 watts.

References

External links
Official website

Radio stations in Minnesota
Classic hits radio stations in the United States
Townsquare Media radio stations
Radio stations established in 1950
1950 establishments in Minnesota